Pyrola elliptica, known as shinleaf, shinleaf pyrola, waxflower shinleaf, elliptic shineleaf and white wintergreen is a species of heath.

Description 
The plant has 5-petaled white flowers and some what elliptical leaves with petioles shorter than the blade. It grows 6-12 inches tall in dry woods and forest, blooming from June through August.

Range 
This species' range includes most of southern Canada and the northern United States, as well as part of the southwestern States.

References 

elliptica
Flora of the United States